Patricia Maria Rozario  is an Indian-born British soprano.

Born and educated in Bombay, India, she went on to study at the Guildhall School of Music and Drama in London.

She has performed at the English National Opera, Opera North, Glyndebourne Festival Opera, and the Garsington Opera in England, and has performed on stage across Europe in Aix-en-Provence, Brussels, Frankfurt, Ghent, Innsbruck, Lyon and Stuttgart.

One of her most notable appearances was across Europe in The Marriage of Figaro, conducted by Sir Georg Solti. She has also given concerts in the Royal Opera House, Covent Garden, and as part of The Proms in England, and abroad in Amsterdam, Athens, Berlin, Halle, Helsinki, Hong Kong, Cologne, Leipzig, Madrid, New York City, Paris, Riga, Rouen, Strasbourg, Vienna, Winterthur and Zürich. She performed in a production of Elvis Costello's Meltdown.

Rozario has made numerous recordings of the works of the composer John Tavener. She was awarded the Order of the British Empire in 2001. Rozario is currently a professor at the Royal College of Music and Trinity Laban where she is a member of the Vocal Faculty.

In 2013, she was awarded the Pravasi Bharatiya Samman by the President of India, Pranab Mukherjee, in recognition of her "outstanding achievements".

References

External links
Rayfield Artists biography
Biography from Naxos Records
News Articles from Goan Voice UK
News Article from Mumbai Mirror

Year of birth missing (living people)
Living people
Goan Catholics
Indian emigrants to England
Alumni of the Guildhall School of Music and Drama
English operatic sopranos
Officers of the Order of the British Empire
Singers from Mumbai
British people of Goan descent
Naturalised citizens of the United Kingdom
Recipients of Pravasi Bharatiya Samman